Grafton Flyford is a village about  east of Worcester, in Worcestershire, England.

It neighbours Stock Green, with the large farm house Hill Top Farm standing on the border.

In 1377, or 1378, Henry de Ardern was granted the manor of Grafton Flyford by the Earl of Warwick for a red rose.

St John's Church
The Church of St John the Baptist is a Grade II* listed building. The earliest parts are of the 13th to 14th century; the tower, of the 14th century, has an embattled parapet, within which is a short stone spire. The east window is 15th-century. The church was restored in 1875 by William Hopkins.

Deserted medieval village
To the north-west and north-east of the church are earthworks (a scheduled monument) showing the remains of a deserted medieval village. Sunken trackways run between the enclosures. Remains of five ponds can be discerned, and an area of medieval ridge and furrows.

Grafton Wood
To the east of the village is Grafton Wood, a nature reserve of the Worcestershire Wildlife Trust. It is ancient woodland, and is the centre of the only colony of brown hairstreak butterflies in the Midlands.

References

Villages in Worcestershire
Wychavon
Deserted medieval villages in Worcestershire